Amaury Cordeel (born 9 July 2002) is a Belgian racing driver currently competing in the 2023 FIA Formula 2 Championship with Virtuosi Racing. He has previously raced in the FIA Formula 3 Championship, Formula Renault Eurocup, Toyota Racing Series and F3 Asian Championship, as well as French, ADAC, Italian, UAE, Spanish and SMP F4. He was the 2018 Spanish F4 champion.

Career

Lower formulae 
Cordeel raced in various types on F4 and made his single seater debut in the 2017 French F4 Championship finishing 16th in the standings with 6 points. In 2018 he raced in the 2018 SMP F4 Championship finishing 8th in the standings with 2 wins and 4 podiums overall. That year he also raced in the 2018 ADAC Formula 4 Championship with ADAC Berlin-Brandenburg e.V. He finished the championship in 23rd with no points to his name but he only competed in 9 races. He then raced in the 2018 Italian F4 Championship with Mucke Motorsport and finished the season 31st in the standings with yet again 0 points finishes, although he only competed in 9 races. Before the real season got underway Cordeel raced in the 2017–18 Formula 4 UAE Championship with Dragon Motopark F4. He finished the season with a race win and 3 podiums. Cordeel's final campaign that year was in 2018 Spanish F4 Championship with MP Motorsport. Cordeel took 4 wins on the way to winning the championship with 208 points. In this extremely tight season he took the 3rd most wins but was the most consistent driver of the 3 championship contenders.

Formula Renault Eurocup

2019 
Cordeel made his debut in the Formula Renault Eurocup in 2019 with MP Motorsport. He finished 15th in the standings with 27 points and a best finish of 7th at the race at Paul Ricard.

2020 
In 2020 he stayed in the Eurocup and moved to FA Racing. He yet again finished 15th in the standings with a best result of 6th at Monza.

F3 Asian Championship 
In 2019 Amaury raced in the 2019 F3 Asian Winter Series with Pinnacle Motorsport. He finished the winter series 10th with a best result of 4th at the Chang International Circuit. He scored a total of 22 points and didn't compete in the final round.

FIA Formula 3 Championship 

Cordeel was announced to race in the 2021 FIA Formula 3 Championship with Campos Racing. At the penultimate round of the season the Belgian qualified in twelfth position, leading to him starting from pole in race one. Cordeel attributed his strong qualifying to him having finally gotten to grips with the tyre degradation. He was unable to use his advantage, as he was involved in a first-lap incident with Alexander Smolyar.

FIA Formula 2 Championship

2022 
Cordeel took part in 2021 Formula 2 post-season testing with Van Amersfoort Racing. He was later announced as one of the team's drivers, partnering Jake Hughes for the 2022 campaign.

Cordeel finished ninth in his first feature race in Bahrain but was demoted to fifteenth for speeding in the pit lane twice. He then received a ten-place grid penalty and four penalty points for failing to slow for red flags during qualifying in Jeddah. He crashed during the sprint race and was forced to withdraw from the feature race as his car could not be repaired in time. At the Imola round, he crashed on his way to the sprint race grid and failed to start. During the feature race, he was penalised twice for speeding in the pit lane and committed six track limits violations, collecting five more penalty points. At the next race in Barcelona, he received another two penalty points for being out of position on the formation lap, leaving him one point away from a race ban. His Monaco feature race ended after hitting the wall at the final corner.

However, he collected a 12th penalty point after a collision with Olli Caldwell in the feature race in Baku, meaning he received a race ban for both races in Silverstone.

On his return to the series at the Austrian round, he achieved his highest qualifying result of the year with seventh place. He was classified eighteenth in the sprint race having been handed penalties for track limits violations and overtaking under yellow flag conditions, receiving four more penalty points. His form would improve following the summer break however, as Cordeel scored points in Zandvoort, Monza and Yas Marina, which propelled him up to 17th in the standings.

2023 
After the end of the 2022 season, Cordeel took part in the post-season test with Virtuosi Racing, having been signed to the Infinity Sports Management programme just a day earlier. Shortly, he was announced as a Virtuosi driver to partner Jack Doohan for the 2023 season.

Personal life 
Cordeel was born on 9 July 2002 in Temse, near Sint-Niklaas, Belgium. His family runs Belgian construction company Cordeel Group NV since 1934. His older brother Ghislain is also a racing driver who competed in the Formula Renault Eurocup and the Porsche Supercup.

Cordeel has been charged with speeding twice. In March 2021 he posted a video speeding on a Flemish motorway to his TikTok account, and later apologised claiming it was not him driving the car. In November 2022 he fronted a Belgian court over an incident in 2020 where he was alleged to have been doing 179kph in a 50kph zone, and was given a 6-month road licence suspension and a €3,600 fine.

Racing record

Racing career summary 

† As Cordeel was a guest driver, he was ineligible to score points.
* Season still in progress.

Complete French F4 Championship results 
(key) (Races in bold indicate pole position) (Races in italics indicate fastest lap)

Complete Formula 4 UAE Championship results 
(key) (Races in bold indicate pole position; races in italics indicate fastest lap)

Complete F4 Spanish Championship results 
(key) (Races in bold indicate pole position; races in italics indicate points for the fastest lap of top ten finishers)

Complete Formula Renault Eurocup results
(key) (Races in bold indicate pole position) (Races in italics indicate fastest lap)

‡ Half points awarded as less than 75% of race distance was completed.

Complete FIA Formula 3 Championship results 
(key) (Races in bold indicate pole position; races in italics indicate points for the fastest lap of top ten finishers)

Complete FIA Formula 2 Championship results 
(key) (Races in bold indicate pole position; races in italics indicate points for the fastest lap of top ten finishers)

* Season still in progress.

References

External links
 

2002 births
Living people
Belgian racing drivers
French F4 Championship drivers
Italian F4 Championship drivers
ADAC Formula 4 drivers
Formula Renault Eurocup drivers
FIA Formula 3 Championship drivers
FIA Formula 2 Championship drivers
Auto Sport Academy drivers
Mücke Motorsport drivers
MP Motorsport drivers
Pinnacle Motorsport drivers
Van Amersfoort Racing drivers
FA Racing drivers
Campos Racing drivers
People from Temse
Sportspeople from East Flanders
SMP F4 Championship drivers
Spanish F4 Championship drivers
F3 Asian Championship drivers
Motopark Academy drivers
Drivex drivers
Virtuosi Racing drivers
UAE F4 Championship drivers